Thelma Golden (born 1965 in St. Albans, Queens) is the Director and Chief Curator of The Studio Museum in Harlem, New York City, United States.  Golden joined the Museum as Deputy Director for Exhibitions and Programs in 2000 before succeeding Dr. Lowery Stokes Sims, the Museum's former Director and President, in 2005. She is noted as one of the originators of the term Post-Blackness.

Early life and education
Thelma Golden grew up in Queens, New York. She had her first hands-on training as a senior in high school at the New Lincoln School, training as a curatorial apprentice at the Metropolitan Museum of Art. Golden's decision to become a curator was inspired by Lowery Stokes Sims, the first African-American curator of the Metropolitan Museum of Art. She graduated from Buckley Country Day School in 1980 and earned a B.A. in Art History and African-American Studies from Smith College in 1987. Golden helped put several exhibitions together at the Smith College Museum of Art as a student, including one called "Dorothy C. Miller: With an Eye to American Art", which chronicled the groundbreaking contributions of her signature ‘Americans’ exhibitions. While at Smith, she worked as an intern at The Studio Museum in 1985.

Career
Golden's first curatorial position was at the Studio Museum in Harlem in 1987. She was then a curator at the Whitney Museum of American Art from 1988 to 1998. Golden was the visual arts director at the Jamaica Arts Center in Queens before she became director of the Whitney Museum's outpost in midtown Manhattan (since closed) in 1991. She organized many notable exhibitions, including the controversial 1993 Biennial, directed by Elisabeth Sussman; Black Male: Representations of Masculinity in Contemporary Art (1994–95); Bob Thompson: A Retrospective (1998); Heart, Mind, Body, Soul: New Work from the Collection (1998); and Hindsight: Recent Work from the Permanent Collection (1999).

Known for her support and championship of emerging artists, Golden created a site-specific commissioning program for the Whitney's branch museum at Altria (formerly Philip Morris), and she presented projects by meaningful artists: Alison Saar, Glenn Ligon, Gary Simmons (artist), Romare Bearden, Matthew McCaslin, Suzanne McClelland, Lorna Simpson, Jacob Lawrence, and Leone & MacDonald.

Golden was the Special Projects Curator for contemporary art collectors Peter Norton and Eileen Harris Norton from 1998 to 2000.

Since joining the Studio Museum in 2000 as deputy director for exhibitions, Golden has organized a number of groundbreaking exhibitions, including Isaac Julien: Vagabondia (2000); Martin Puryear: The Cane Project (2000); Glenn Ligon: Stranger (2001); the Freestyle Exhibition (2001); Black Romantic: The Figurative Impulse in Contemporary Art (2002); harlemworld: Metropolis as Metaphor (2004); Chris Ofili: Afro Muses (2005); Frequency (2005–06), with Christine Y. Kim; Africa Comics (2006–07); and Kori Newkirk: 1997–2007 (2007–08). In 2005 she became the Studio Museum's director and chief curator. She also works to expand and strengthen the museum's presence in the local community and the global art world. The Studio Museum's visitorship has increased during her tenure as director, and a $122 million expansion is underway. Designed by Adjaye Associates and Cooper Robertson, it will be the museum's first purpose-built expansion.

Golden is an active guest curator, writer, lecturer, juror, and advisor. In 2009, she presented "How Art Gives Shape to Cultural Change" at the TED conference's 25th anniversary gathering in Palm Springs, California.  Her talk examined how contemporary artists continue to shape dialogue about race, culture, and community. In 2008, she was a member of the advisory team of the Whitney Biennial and in 2007 acted as a juror for the UK Turner Prize.  In 2004, Golden curated a retrospective of fashion designer Patrick Kelly at the Brooklyn Museum. She then co-curated the traveling exhibition Glenn Ligon: Some Changes in 2005. Known for her interviews with contemporary artists, Golden is a frequent contributor to books, catalogues, and magazines and regularly speaks at institutions around the world as well as teaching at various universities. Golden serves on the Graduate Committee at the Center for Curatorial Studies at Bard College, is a member of the Association of Art Museum Directors, is on the boards of Creative Time in New York and the Institute of International Visual Arts (inIVA) in London, and was a 2008 Henry Crown Fellow at the Aspen Institute. The New York City's cultural advisory committee invited Golden to serve on their committee in 2015. In 2016, Golden became a member on the board of trustees at the Los Angeles County Museum of Art (LACMA).

In 2010, Golden was appointed to the Committee for the Preservation of the White House. During Obama's presidency, in 2015, Golden joined the board of directors at the Obama Foundation as she had been asked to organize the design and plan of the presidential library. Golden served on the Committee for the Preservation of the White House until 2016.

Personal life
Golden married London-based fashion designer Duro Olowu in 2008.

Awards
 2003: Honorary Doctor of Fine Arts, Moore College of Art and Design
 2004: Honorary Doctor of Fine Arts, Smith College
 2008: Honorary Doctor of Fine Arts, San Francisco Art Institute
2009: Honorary Doctor, City College of New York
2010: Medal of Distinction, Barnard College
2014: The 100 Most Powerful Women In Art #33
 2014: Top 25 most important women in the art world by Artnet
 2015: Ford Foundation Art of Change Fellow
 2016: Audrey Irmas Award for Curatorial Excellence
2017: National Arts Award for outstanding contributions to the arts, Americans for the Arts
2017: Groundbreaker Award from Prospect.4 New Orleans
2018: J. Paul Getty Medal, J. Paul Getty Trust
2018: Honorary degree, Columbia University
2019: Most Influential People In The Contemporary Artworld #7

Publications 

 1990: The Decade Show: Frameworks of Identity in the 1980s,  New Museum of Contemporary Art, 
1994: Black Male: Representations of Masculinity in Contemporary American Art, ABRAMS, 
1998: Bob Thompson (Ahmanson-Murphy Fine Arts Book), University of California Press, 
1998: Glenn Ligon: Un/Becoming, University of Pennsylvania, Institute of Contemporary Art, 
1999: Carrie Mae Weems: Recent Work, 1992-1998, George Braziller, 
2001: Freestyle: The Studio Museum In Harlem, Studio Museum in Harlem, 
2002: Lorna Simpson (Contemporary Artists),  Phaidon Press,

References

External links
 

1965 births
Living people
American art curators
American women curators
Buckley Country Day School alumni
Directors of museums in the United States
Women museum directors
People from St. Albans, Queens
Smith College alumni
American arts administrators
Women arts administrators
Henry Crown Fellows
People associated with the Whitney Museum of American Art
21st-century American women